Tamara Čurović (Serbian Cyrillic: Тамара Чуровић; born 31 October 1994) is a Serbian professional tennis player.

Čurović was an official member of Serbia Fed Cup team in 2011, but she is yet to play her first Fed Cup match.

She has won five singles and 34 doubles titles on the ITF Women's Circuit. On 27 May 2013, she reached her best singles ranking of world No. 394. On 19 May 2014, she peaked at No. 208 in the WTA doubles rankings.

Čurović made her WTA Tour main-draw debut in doubles at the 2013 Gastein Ladies, partnering Chiara Scholl. They defeated Michaela Hončová and Conny Perrin in the first round and top seeds Mandy Minella and Chanelle Scheepers in the quarterfinals, before losing to eventual champions, Sandra Klemenschits and Andreja Klepač. At the same tournament, Čurović lost in the first round of the singles qualifying. To date, her only other WTA Tour main-draw appearance in doubles was at the 2014 Bucharest Open, partnering with Elitsa Kostova and losing in the first round.

Personal life
Tamara Čurović was born to Slavko Čurović and Svetlana Prudnikova, a former Russian chess champion. She has a brother, Vladislav. Čurović began playing tennis aged nine at a local tennis club, and is currently a member of the Partizan Tennis Club. She cites Maria Sharapova, Ana Ivanovic and Jelena Janković as her idols.

ITF Circuit finals

Singles: 15 (6 titles, 9 runner–ups)

Doubles: 60 (34 titles, 26 runner–ups)

Other finals

Awards
 2008 – Tennis Association of Serbia Award for Best Female Player U–14

 2009 – Tennis Association of Serbia Award for Best Female Player U–16

Notes

References

External links
 
 
 

1994 births
Living people
Tennis players from Belgrade
Serbian female tennis players
Serbian people of Russian descent